Pariahuanca District may refer to:

 Pariahuanca District, Carhuaz
 Pariahuanca District, Huancayo